Roll Along, Cowboy is a 1937 American musical Western film directed by Gus Meins. It is based on the 1931 novel The Dude Ranger by Zane Grey, and is the second adaptation of the novel, after the 1934 film The Dude Ranger.

Plot summary

Differences from novel

Cast 
Smith Ballew as Randy Porter
Cecilia Parker as Janet Blake
Stanley Fields as Barry Barker
Ruth Robinson as Edwina Blake
Wally Albright as Danny Blake
Frank Milan as Arthur Hathaway
Bill Elliott as Odie Fenton
Budd Buster as Cowhand Shorty
Harry Bernard as Ranch foreman Shep
Buster Fite as Singing cowhand
Buster Fite and His Six Saddle Tramps as Singing cowhands

Soundtrack

External links 

1937 films
1937 Western (genre) films
Films based on works by Zane Grey
American Western (genre) films
American black-and-white films
1930s English-language films
Films based on American novels
20th Century Fox films
Films produced by Sol Lesser
1930s American films